The Roman Catholic Archdiocese of Cuenca is an archdiocese located in the city of Cuenca in Ecuador. Erected as the Diocese of Cuenca from territory of the Diocese of Quito on 1 July 1786, it was elevated to archdiocese status on 9 April 1957.

Ordinaries
Bishops of Cuenca
José Carrión y Marfil (18 Dec 1786 – 3 Jul 1798), appointed Bishop of Trujillo, Peru
José Cuero y Caicedo (3 Jul 1798 – 23 Dec 1801), appointed Bishop of Quito
Francisco Javier Fita y Carrión (y Lafita) (28 Mar 1803 – 24 May 1804)
Andrés Quintian Ponte de Andrade (9 Sep 1805 – 24 Jun 1813)
José Ignacio Cortázar y Labayen (15 Mar 1815 – 16 Jul 1818)
Félix Calixto Miranda y Suárez de Figueroa (21 May 1827 – 1829)
Pedro Antonio Torres (27 Jan 1843 – 17 Jan 1846)
José Manuel Plaza de la Tejera, O.F.M. (3 Jul 1848 – 22 Sep 1853)
Giuseppe Antonio Remigio Esteves de Toral (22 Jul 1861 – 2 May 1883)
Miguel León y Garrido (13 Nov 1884 – 31 Mar 1900)
Manuel Maria Polit y Laso (11 Jan 1907 – 7 Jun 1918)
Daniel Hermida Ortega (10 Mar 1918 – 30 Sep 1956)
Manuel de Jesús Serrano Abad (16 Nov 1956 – 21 Apr 1971)
became archbishop on 9 April 1957
Archbishops of Cuenca
Ernesto Alvarez Alvarez, S.D.B. (21 Apr 1971 – 21 Jul 1980)
coadjutor archbishop 1970–1971
Luis Alberto Luna Tobar, O.C.D. (7 Mar 1981 – 15 Feb 2000)
Vicente Rodrigo Cisneros Durán (15 Feb 2000 – 20 Apr 2009)
Luís Cabrera Herrera, O.F.M. (20 Apr 2009 – 24 September 2015), appointed Archbishop of Guayaquil
Marco Pérez Caicedo (20 June 2016 – present)

Auxiliary bishops
José Ignacio Checa y Barba (1861-1866), appointed Bishop of Ibarra
Manuel de Jesús Serrano Abad (1954-1956), appointed Bishop here
José Gabriel Diaz Cueva (1967-1968), appointed Bishop of Azogues
José Bolivar Piedra Aguirre (2019-2022), appointed Bishop of Riobamba

Other priests of this diocese who became bishops
Francisco Xavier de Garaycoa Llaguno, appointed Bishop of Guayaquil in 1838
Oswaldo Patricio Vintimilla Cabrera, appointed Bishop of Azogues in 2016
Alberto Maria Ordóñez Crespo, appointed Bishop of Ibarra in 1916
Guillermo José Harris y Morales, appointed Bishop of Loja in 1920

Suffragan dioceses
Azogues
Loja
Machala

Special churches
Cathedral: Cathedral of the Immaculate Conception, Cuenca
Minor Basilica: Basilica of the Perpetual Help, Cuenca

See also
Roman Catholicism in Ecuador

Sources
GCatholic.org
Catholic Hierarchy
Old Archdiocesan website

Roman Catholic dioceses in Ecuador
Roman Catholic Ecclesiastical Province of Cuenca
Religious organizations established in 1786
Dioceses established in the 18th century
Cuenca, Ecuador
1786 establishments in New Spain